José de Albuquerque (born 20 April 1935) is a Portuguese fencer. He competed in the individual and team épée events at the 1960 Summer Olympics.

References

External links
 

1935 births
Living people
Portuguese male épée fencers
Olympic fencers of Portugal
Fencers at the 1960 Summer Olympics
Sportspeople from Lisbon